Michael D. Xavier (born Michael David Smith; 27 November 1978) is an English actor and singer.

Early life
Michael David Smith (later known as Michael Xavier) attended Knutsford High and ultimately completed his professional acting training at the Manchester Metropolitan University in 1999. His first professional role and London West End debut was in the musical comedy Pageant in 2000.

Work in theatre 

Xavier has been nominated twice for a Laurence Olivier Award.  He was first nominated for Best Performance in a Supporting Role in a Musical in 2011 for his performance as Cinderella's Prince/Wolf in Into the Woods at the Regent's Park Open Air Theatre. The same year he was also nominated for the Best Actor in a Musical for his performance as Oliver in the musical Love Story at the Duchess Theatre. In January 2017, Xavier's lead performance in "Sunset Boulevard" (at the London Coliseum) won the 2016 BroadwayWorld UK/West End Award for Best Actor in a New Production of a Musical.

Xavier has worked in lead roles on stage in the United Kingdom for 20 years. Notable productions in which he has appeared include Miss Saigon, My Fair Lady, The Phantom of the Opera, Oklahoma!, and The Sound of Music.  In 2014, he played Sid Sorokin opposite Joanna Riding in The Pajama Game at the Shaftesbury Theatre in London.

In 2008, Xavier played Rock Hudson in Tim Fountain's play Rock at the Unity Theatre in Liverpool, the Library Theatre in Manchester, and the Oval House Theatre in London.  It went on to be produced as a radio play by production company Made in Manchester, and won the Best Online Only Audio Drama award at the BBC Audio Drama Awards in 2012.

Theatre credits

Work in television and film 

Although Xavier is primarily a theatre actor, he has also gained television credits including Lieutenant Hamilton Knox in Outlander (Stars), Christopher Miles in The Blacklist (NBC), Dr. Steph Belcombe in Gentleman Jack (BBC) and DCI Elliott Wallace in season 7 of Grantchester (ITV). As well as roles in Grace (ITV) and The Chelsea Detective (ITV).

Xavier's film work includes his portrayal of Maurice in Hallmark's 'Paris, Wine & Romance' directed by Alex Zamm, Tom in the 2014 production 'Never Let Go' with director Howard J Ford for Latitude Films, scheduled for release in 2015. In 2013, he appeared as Rob in the short film 'Gnomeland' by writer/director Francesca Jaynes, as well as playing a Russian Gulag Prisoner in Walt Disney Pictures' 'Muppets Most Wanted', filmed at Pinewood Studios.

Major television and film credits

Presenting and recording work 

In 2013, Xavier co-presented the Olivier Awards BBC Radio 2 Covent Garden Stage with Claudia Winkleman, and returned again in 2014 to co-present on the ITV Stage with Myleene Klass. He also hosted the UK Theatre Awards at the historic Guildhall in the City of London in both 2013 and 2014.

In addition, Xavier has worked as a recording artist, with both radio and original soundtrack credits to his name. In 2007, BBC Radio 2 presented a special edition of Friday Night is Music Night, celebrating the work of Leonard Bernstein and the 50th anniversary of West Side Story. Paul Gambaccini presented the program at London's Mermaid Theatre, featuring the BBC Concert Orchestra and Xavier as Tony. He also played Artie Green in the BBC Radio 2 live recording of Sunset Boulevard, performed at the Cork Opera House with Michael Ball and Petula Clark. Outside of radio, his work in recordings includes Bumblescratch (2016 London Concert Cast Recording) Collaborations: The Songs of Elliot Davis (2013), Lift (2012 Concept Album), Soho Cinders (2011 Concert Cast), Love Story (2011 Original London Cast), and Little Women (2004 Studio Cast).

MX Masterclass 

Xavier is the Principal of MX Masterclass, a training school for musical theatre students which aims to aid them in gaining acceptance to professional training colleges. The school runs every Sunday, based at Rambert, Upper Ground. Their patrons are Matthew Bourne, Natalie Paris, Emily Carey and Sebastian Croft. Regular teachers over the years have included Anna Tringham, Ross Sharkey, Lucinda Lawrence, Brandon Lee Sears, Nicola Coates, Peter Polycarpou and Alex Young. Students are also taught by guest performers and practitioners including Kerry Ellis, Ramin Karimloo, Rebecca Trehearn, Marc Antolin, Robbie Sherman, Katie Brayben, Louise Dearman, Trevor Dion Nicholas and Matt Henry (singer). The students are often given an opportunity to perform at various charity and West End events at which Xavier also appears. The students also appear at a Christmas concert at St Paul's, Covent Garden, alongside industry professionals. The 2016 concert was hosted by Rufus Hound. 
Students have many performance opportunities throughout the year and gain national and local news coverage in the process. On three occasions they performed at The Best of the West End concert at The Royal Albert Hall starring many big West End names including Xavier himself.
They have also performed at Lambert Jackson Productions concert, West End Women and Main Men Of Musicals

References

External links
 Official Website
 IMDB
 
 

20th-century English male actors
1977 births
Living people
21st-century English male actors
Male actors from Liverpool
English male musical theatre actors
English male stage actors